Treason in My Breast is a 1938 mystery detective novel by Anthony Gilbert, the pen name of British writer Lucy Beatrice Malleson. It is the fourth in her long-running series featuring the unscrupulous London solicitor and detective Arthur Crook. Crook became one of the established characters of the Golden Age of Detective Fiction, although in this case the novel was more similar to a Victorian melodrama than a conventional whodunnit.

Synopsis
From her window, a housewife believes she has witnessed the build-up to a murder of a young woman in the flat opposite. She calls in Arthur Crook to assist her in unravelling a seemingly ingenious attempt to steal a large inheritance.

References

Bibliography
 Magill, Frank Northen . Critical Survey of Mystery and Detective Fiction: Authors, Volume 2. Salem Press, 1988.
Murphy, Bruce F. The Encyclopedia of Murder and Mystery. Springer, 1999.
 Reilly, John M. Twentieth Century Crime & Mystery Writers. Springer, 2015.

1938 British novels
British mystery novels
British thriller novels
Novels by Anthony Gilbert
Novels set in London
British detective novels
Collins Crime Club books